Riverside is a small unincorporated community on the border of Davis Township and Logan Township in Fountain County, Indiana, United States.

History
Riverside was originally called Fountain City, and under the latter name was established in the 1850s when the Wabash Railroad was extended to that point. The post office was established as Riverside in 1872, and remained in operation until it was discontinued in 1946.

Geography
Independence Station is in Riverside and dates from the time the Wabash Railroad was built to this point in 1854. The larger town of Independence is opposite Riverside on the north bank of the Wabash.

References

Gallery

Unincorporated communities in Fountain County, Indiana
Unincorporated communities in Indiana